CNC typically refers to computer numerical control, the automated control of machining tools by computer.

CNC or cnc may also refer to:

Companies
 China Netcom, a Chinese telecommunications provider
 China Xinhua News Network Corporation, state-run television news channel in China aimed at a foreign audience
 Community Newspaper Company, a former Massachusetts newspaper chain now part of GateHouse Media

Government
 Cadet Nurse Corps, a World War II-era United States government program to train nurses
 Cantabrian Nationalist Council, a nationalist/left-wing party in Cantabria, Spain
 Centre national du cinéma et de l'image animée, a cinema regulatory agency under the French Ministry of Culture
 Ceylon National Congress, a former political party in Ceylon
 Civil Nuclear Constabulary, a UK police force that guards nuclear installations
 National Congress of the Canaries, known in Spanish as Congreso Nacional de Canarias

Education
 Centre for Neuroscience and Cell Biology, a bioscience and biomedicine research institute of the University of Coimbra
 Colegio Nacional de la Capital, a public high school in Asuncion, Paraguay
 College of New Caledonia, a post-secondary educational institution that serves the residents of the Central Interior of British Columbia
 Chippewa Nature Center, a private non-profit educational facility in Midland, Michigan

Other
 Cancer (constellation), astronomical constellation (IAU abbreviation Cnc)
 City Nature Challenge, an urban bioblitz competition
 Configurable Network Computing, a JD Edwards client-server architecture
 Consensual non-consensuality, a BDSM practice
 Haas CNC Racing, the original name of Stewart Haas Racing
 Czech National Corpus, a corpus of Czech language
 Coconut Island Airport, IATA airport code "CNC"

See also
 C&C (disambiguation)